Polynesian tree snail is a common name applied to a number of species of arboreal land snail.

 Partula affinis
 Partula arguta 
 Partula atilis
 Partula aurantia
 Partula auriculata
 Partula bilineata 
 Partula callifera
 Partula candida
 Partula cedista
 Partula citrina

 Partula clara
 Partula crassilabris
 Partula cuneata
 Partula cytherea
 Partula dentifera
 Partula dolichostoma
 Partula dolorosa
 Partula eremita
 Partula exigua
 Partula faba

 Partula filosa
 Partula formosa
 Partula fusca
 Partula garretti
 Partula hebe
 Partula hyalina
 Partula labrusca
 Partula leptochila
 Partula levilineata
 Partula levistriata

 Partula lugubris
 Partula lutea
 Partula mirabilis
 Partula mooreana
 Partula navigatoria
 Partula nodosa
 Partula ovalis
 Partula planilabrum
 Partula producta
 Partula protracta

 Partula radiata
 Partula remota
 Partula robusta
 Partula rosea 
 Partula rustica
 Partula sagitta
 Partula suturalis 
 Partula taeniata
 Partula thalia
 Partula tohiveana
 
 Partula tristis
 Partula turgida
 Partula umbilicata
 Partula varia
 Partula vittata
 Samoana annectens
 Samoana attenuata
 Samoana bellula
 Samoana burchi
 Samoana decussatula

 Samoana diaphana
 Samoana dryas
 Samoana ganymedes
 Samoana hamadryas
 Samoana inflata
 Samoana jackieburchi
 Samoana magdalinae
 Samoana margaritae
 Samoana oreas
 Samoana strigata

References 

Mollusc common names